Bayonet (Italian:Arma bianca) is a 1936 Italian historical adventure film directed by Ferdinando Maria Poggioli and starring Nerio Bernardi, Leda Gloria and Mimì Aylmer. It portrays the life of Giacomo Casanova.

Cast
 Nerio Bernardi as Giacomo Casanova
Leda Gloria as Manon, la ballerina
Mimì Aylmer as Agata
Romolo Costa as il duca di Parma
Tina Lattanzi as la duchessa di Parma
Antonio Centa as il servitore di Casanova
Enzo Biliotti as conte Paliski
Oreste Bilancia as cav. Kauffmann
Cesare Zoppetti as magg. Bertolan
Giuseppe Pierozzi as proprietario osteria
Lydia Simoneschi as Marina, la figlia dell'oste
Gino Viotti as Dubois
Mauro Serra as carceriere
Andrea Checchi as attendente del duca

References

Bibliography 
 Moliterno, Gino. Historical Dictionary of Italian Cinema. Scarecrow Press, 2008.

External links 

1936 films
Italian historical comedy films
1930s historical comedy films
1930s Italian-language films
Films directed by Ferdinando Maria Poggioli
Films set in the 18th century
Italian black-and-white films
1936 comedy films
1930s Italian films